Walpole Gillespie Colerick (August 1, 1845 – January 11, 1911) was an American lawyer and politician who served two terms as a U.S. Representative from Indiana from 1879 to 1883.

Biography 
Born in Fort Wayne, Indiana, Colerick attended public schools and studied law.
He was admitted to the bar in 1872 and commenced practice in Fort Wayne.

Colerick was elected as a Democrat to the Forty-sixth and Forty-seventh Congresses (March 4, 1879 – March 3, 1883) and was a Supreme Court commissioner from 1883 to 1885.
He again engaged in the practice of law in Fort Wayne until his death there on January 11, 1911.
He was interred in Lindenwood Cemetery.

References

1845 births
1911 deaths
Politicians from Fort Wayne, Indiana
Democratic Party members of the United States House of Representatives from Indiana
19th-century American politicians